Hustle Till I Die is the second studio album by Three 6 Mafia member Juicy J, released June 16, 2009. The LP was released on Hypnotize Minds, with manufacturing and distribution from Select-O-Hits. The album debuted at number 106 on the Billboard 200 chart, selling 5,800 copies its first week. The first single from the album was called "30 Inches" and was released on iTunes on May 12, 2009, the original version was released on Juicy J's YouTube page and featured brother and fellow Memphis rapper Project Pat, there was then a remix released which featured rapper Gucci Mane.

Track listing

References 

2009 albums
Columbia Records albums
Juicy J albums
Sony BMG albums
Albums produced by Juicy J